Mand, or Atemble, is a Papuan language of Madang Province, Papua New Guinea.

It is spoken in Atemble village of Arabaka Rural LLG.

Phonology

Vowels

References

External links 
 PARADISEC archive of Atemble language materials

Critically endangered languages
Sogeram languages
Languages of Madang Province
Endangered Papuan languages